The 1888–89 season was Accrington's first season in the Football League which had just been founded. Because of this Accrington became one of the founder members of the Football League. They finished in 7th position level on points with Everton.

Final league table

Key: P = Matches played; W = Matches won; D = Matches drawn; L = Matches lost; F = Goals for; A = Goals against; GA = Goal average; Pts = Points

Results

Accrington's score comes first

Legend

Football League

FA Cup

Appearances

See also
1888–89 in English football

References
 
 

Acc